Naima Reddick (born May 26, 1984) is an American rugby union player. She was selected for the squad to the 2017 Women's Rugby World Cup in Ireland.

Early career 
Reddick started playing rugby at Piedmont High School. She then played for Chico State University for five years. She has played for the Berkeley All Blues, NorCal Triple Threat, Northern United in Porirua, New Zealand and also for the Wellington Pride provincial side, San Francisco Golden Gate RFC and currently for the Seattle Saracens.

She represented the Eagles Under 19 team in 2003 and the Under 23s from 2006 to 2007. She went to the 2010 and 2014 Women's Rugby World Cups.

References

External links 
 Naima Reddick at USA Rugby
 

1984 births
Living people
American female rugby union players
United States women's international rugby union players
Wellington rugby union players
California State University, Chico alumni
21st-century American women